Legislation is the process or result of enrolling, enacting, or promulgating laws by a legislature, parliament, or analogous governing body. Before an item of legislation becomes law it may be known as a bill, and may be broadly referred to as "legislation" while it remains under consideration to distinguish it from other business. Legislation can have many purposes: to regulate, to authorize, to outlaw, to provide (funds), to sanction, to grant, to declare, or to restrict. It may be contrasted with a non-legislative act by an executive or administrative body under the authority of a legislative act.

Overview

Legislation is usually proposed by a member of the legislature (e.g. a member of Congress or Parliament), or by the executive, whereupon it is debated by members of the legislature and is often amended before passage. Most large legislatures enact only a small fraction of the bills proposed in a given session. Whether a given bill will be proposed is generally a matter of the legislative priorities of the government.

Legislation is regarded as one of the three main functions of government, which are often distinguished under the doctrine of the separation of powers. Those who have the formal power to create legislation are known as legislators; a urtication of government will have the formal power to interpret legislation (see statutory interpretation); the executive branch of government can act only within the powers and limits set by the law, which is the instrument by which the fundamental powers of government are established.

Dead letter

The term "dead letter" refers to legislation that has not been revoked, but that has become inapplicable or obsolete, or is no longer enforced.

See also 
 Rule according to higher law

References

External links
 
 Most-Viewed Bills on Congress.gov

Politics
Legislatures
Law by type